Connor Danford Overton (born July 24, 1993) is an American professional baseball pitcher for the Cincinnati Reds of Major League Baseball (MLB). He previously played for the Toronto Blue Jays and Pittsburgh Pirates.

Early life and amateur career
Overton was born in Richmond, Virginia and grew up in the Richmond suburb of Mechanicsville, Virginia. He attended Atlee High School, where was a relief pitcher and primarily played shortstop. Overton played college baseball at Old Dominion.

Professional career

Miami Marlins
Overton was selected by the Miami Marlins in the 15th round of the 2014 Major League Baseball Draft. Overton made his professional debut with the Low-A Batavia Muckdogs, pitching to a 4.71 ERA in 17 appearances. He began the 2015 season with the Single-A Greensboro Grasshoppers, but was released by the Marlins on July 9, 2015, after struggling to a 13.03 ERA in 8 games.

Washington Nationals
On July 17, 2015, Overton signed a minor league contract with the Washington Nationals organization. He split the remainder of the year with the Low-A Auburn Doubledays, logging a 3.72 ERA in 12 games, and also pitched in one game for the Triple-A Syracuse Chiefs. He elected free agency following the season on November 6.

Sioux City Explorers
Overton signed with the Sioux City Explorers of the independent American Association of Professional Baseball on April 13, 2016. He went 5–1 on the season with a 1.96 ERA and 11 saves and was named a league All-Star before signing with the Giants.

San Francisco Giants
On August 11, 2016, Overton signed a minor league contract with the San Francisco Giants. Overton appeared in one game for the High-A San Jose Giants, allowing 2 earned runs in 1/3 of an inning before undergoing Tommy John surgery and missing the entire 2017 season. He split the 2018 season between three affiliates: San Jose, the Double-A Richmond Flying Squirrels, and the Triple-A Sacramento River Cats. In 23 appearances between the three teams, Overton posted a cumulative 4.91 ERA with 48 strikeouts in 47.2 innings of work. Overton returned to Richmond to begin the 2019 season, and posted a 3.62 ERA in 14 appearances for the team. On June 12, 2019, Overton was released by the Giants organization.

Lancaster Barnstormers
On August 6, 2019, Overton signed with the Lancaster Barnstormers of the Atlantic League of Professional Baseball. In 9 games with the team, he registered a 4.02 ERA with 56 strikeouts in 53.2 innings of work. He became a free agent following the season.

Toronto Blue Jays
On February 29, 2020, Overton signed a minor league contract with the Toronto Blue Jays and was assigned to the Double-A New Hampshire Fisher Cats. Overton did not play in a game in 2020 due to the cancellation of the minor league season because of the COVID-19 pandemic. He became a free agent on November 2, 2020. Overton re-signed with the Blue Jays on a minor league contract on February 2, 2021. He was assigned to the Triple-A Buffalo Bisons to begin the year, where he pitched to a 2.03 ERA with 50 strikeouts in 21 appearances.

The Blue Jays selected Overton's contract and promoted him the major leagues for the first time on August 11, 2021. On August 12, 2021, he made his major league debut against the Los Angeles Angels. In 4 appearances for the Blue Jays in 2021, Overton did not give up a run, while striking out 4. On September 3, 2021, Overton was designated for assignment by the Blue Jays.

Pittsburgh Pirates
On September 6, 2021, Overton was claimed off waivers by the Pittsburgh Pirates. On September 16, Overton pitched 3.0 scoreless innings against the Cincinnati Reds. In doing so, Overton made MLB history, having the most career innings without allowing a run, with 10.2 innings pitched. His streak ended at 13.2 innings after he allowed a home run to Didi Gregorius of the Philadelphia Phillies on September 23. Overton was shut down for the season on September 28 after he was placed on the injured list with a right shoulder strain. He finished the season with a combined 4.70 ERA in 9 appearances between the Blue Jays and Pirates, striking out 15 in 15.1 innings of work. On November 6, Overton was outrighted off of the 40-man roster. He elected free agency on November 7.

Cincinnati Reds
On November 17, 2021, Overton signed a minor league contract with the Cincinnati Reds. He was assigned to the Triple-A Louisville Bats to begin the 2022 season.

On April 30, 2022, Overton was selected to the active roster to start against the Colorado Rockies. On May 12, Overton earned his first career win, tossing 6.1 scoreless innings against the Pittsburgh Pirates. On May 23, an MRI revealed Overton had a stress reaction in his lower back and he was placed on the 60-day injured list.

He ended up starting four games for the Reds, finishing with a 1-0 record

References

External links

Old Dominion Monarchs bio

1993 births
Living people
Baseball players from Richmond, Virginia
Major League Baseball pitchers
Toronto Blue Jays players
Pittsburgh Pirates players
Cincinnati Reds players
Old Dominion Monarchs baseball players
Batavia Muckdogs players
Syracuse Chiefs players
Greensboro Grasshoppers players
Richmond Flying Squirrels players
Sacramento River Cats players
San Jose Giants players
Auburn Doubledays players
Buffalo Bisons (minor league) players
Lancaster Barnstormers players
Sioux City Explorers players
Indianapolis Indians players
Louisville Bats players